The 1949 World Table Tennis Championships men's singles was the 16th edition of the men's singles championship. 

Johnny Leach defeated Bohumil Váňa in the final, winning three sets to two to secure the title.

Results

+ Time limit rule applied

See also
List of World Table Tennis Championships medalists

References

-